"Ajab Tamasha" (literal English translation: "Strange Circus") is a song by the Pakistani rock band Entity Paradigm. The song along with the music video was released on 21 December 2012 as part of the band's tenth anniversary. This is the first single released after the departure of Fawad Khan, who left to focus on his acting career and Drummer "Waqar Khan" who left because he moved from Lahore to Islamabad.

Music video
The music video tells the problems being faced by Pakistan and rest of the world. Farhad Humayun of Overload also makes a guest appearance. The video has been directed by Ahmed Ali Butt, himself.

Critical reception
Ajab Tamasha has received mixed to negative reviews. Haseeb Peer of Pakium said this one does not have the same essence as Shor Macha. Ahmed Uzair of Koolmuzone called it literally an Ajab Tamasha by the remains of EP. Express Tribune gave a positive review and said: EP stays true to its sound in a new era.

Track listing
Ajab Tamasha

Charts
The song debuted at number 7 on the ARY Musik Top 10 List.

References

External links
 

2012 singles
Pakistani songs
2012 songs